John Leonard Olson (May 22, 1910 – October 12, 1985) was an American radio personality and television announcer. Olson is perhaps best known for his work as an announcer for game shows, particularly the work he did for Mark Goodson-Bill Todman Productions. Olson was the longtime announcer for the original To Tell the Truth and What's My Line?, and spent over a decade as the announcer for both Match Game and The Price Is Right, working on the latter series at the time of his death.

Early career
Born in Windom, Minnesota, Olson was the youngest of ten children. He enrolled in pharmacy classes at the University of Minnesota. He also worked a string of odd jobs, from soda jerk to singer. After 1928, he landed jobs at WIBA in Poynette, Wisconsin and KGDA in Mitchell, South Dakota. 

Olson joined WTMJ in Milwaukee in early 1933, organizing a five-piece jazz band called The Rhythm Rascals, and became one of the station's most popular personalities. The Rascals eventually made it to Hollywood, and would send daily recordings of their shows back to WTMJ. Olson would eventually return to Milwaukee and WTMJ, where he would go on to create the first iteration of Johnny Olson's Rumpus Room. The show attracted major national performers, including Spike Jones and The Andrews Sisters. By 1942, the immense popularity of Rumpus Room prompted WTMJ to dedicate the large unfinished television studio (plans for what would later become WTMJ-TV were suspended due to World War II) in their new facility to the program. 

Olson's first network job on radio was in New York City in 1944, hosting (with his wife) the audience-participation show Ladies Be Seated, a stunt game along the lines of Truth or Consequences, broadcast on NBC Blue. He had previously hosted several radio shows in Chicago, including the second iteration of Johnny Olson's Rumpus Room, a late-night variety show broadcast from 10:30 p.m. to 12 midnight, which was also the name of a later daytime talk show he hosted on the DuMont Television Network. He also was host of Johnny Olson's Luncheon Club on ABC radio in 1950-1951.

Work for DuMont Television Network
In 1945, Olson and his wife hosted a five-week run of a TV version of Ladies Be Seated. From May 1947 to July 1949, Olson hosted Doorway to Fame, an evening television talent show on the new DuMont Television Network. From January 1949 to July 1952, Olson hosted Johnny Olson's Rumpus Room, a daytime television talk show which was the first daytime show broadcast from DuMont's flagship station WABD over DuMont's small East Coast network. Olson also hosted the Saturday-morning children's show Kids and Company on DuMont from September 1951 to June 1952, with co-host Ham Fisher.

Early announcing work
On television, Olson was an announcer on Break the Bank and was the announcer and sometimes the host on Fun for the Money on ABC-TV in 1949. Olson also was the announcer for Play Your Hunch.

Olson was host of Homemaker's Jamboree, an audience-participation game show that debuted on WJZ-TV on October 5, 1952.

Beginning in 1960, Olson announced the CBS prime-time panel game To Tell the Truth. The following year, he added duties on sister show What's My Line?, and in 1962 began announcing on the original Match Game in daytime on NBC until that series ended in 1969. Before going live, Olson did an audience warm-up by asking questions and getting the audience ready for the live telecast.

Olson was also announcer for The Jackie Gleason Show from 1962 until its cancellation in 1970.

Olson continued to announce What's My Line? and To Tell the Truth after both shows moved from CBS to syndication in the late 1960s. His involvement with those shows ended when he was designated announcer of the 1972 revivals of The Price Is Right and I've Got a Secret, both of which were taped in Hollywood, where he relocated.

He was the announcer, from 1966 to 1970, for five of The Jerry Lewis MDA Labor Day Telethons.

The Price Is Right
While Name That Tune, To Tell the Truth, What's My Line, and The Match Game put Olson in the elite class of television game-show announcers, the revival of The Price Is Right cemented Olson's fame. In addition to serving as host Bob Barker's sidekick, Olson was a beloved and valued member of the "cast." He warmed up the audiences prior to taping; during taping, he often received on-camera exposure (occasionally bantering with Barker) prior to calling out the contestants' names; he also frequently appeared in the showcases.

His exhortation for contestants to "Come on down!" became a catchphrase, and a Price Is Right tradition observed by his successors Rod Roddy (1986–2003), Rich Fields (2004–2010), and George Gray (2011–present).

Match Game and later career
Olson began announcing for the revived Match Game. Like executive producer Mark Goodson, Olson filled in on the days when a scheduled guest failed to appear in time for a taping. Olson only missed one taping of Match Game during the CBS years; Bern Bennett served as his fill-in for one week of daytime shows and one nighttime show in 1975 (a week's worth of shows was taped in one workday). 

During the 1970s and early 1980s, during the peak of his announcing duties on Price and Match, he worked on several other Goodson-Todman game shows. He announced:

He also filled in for:

Death
On October 6, 1985, Olson suffered a stroke and was taken to St. Johns Hospital and Health Center in Santa Monica, California, where he died on  October 12, 1985, at age 75.  Shortly afterwards, Bob Barker paid tribute to him at the end of the remaining episodes of TPIR that were taped with Olson as announcer before he died:

References

External links
 
 
 POV OnLine
 

1910 births
1985 deaths
American radio personalities
Game show announcers
People from Lewisburg, West Virginia
People from Windom, Minnesota
Radio and television announcers
Radio personalities from Minneapolis
Television personalities from New York City
The Price Is Right
University of Minnesota College of Pharmacy alumni